D408 is a four lane state road branching off from the D30 state road connecting Zagreb Airport to Croatian motorway network via A3 motorway Kosnica interchange and to the cities of Zagreb and Velika Gorica.

The road, as well as all other state roads in Croatia, is managed and maintained by Hrvatske ceste, state owned company.

Road junctions and populated areas

Maps

Sources

See also
 Zagreb Airport

State roads in Croatia
Zagreb County